Cuneta is a surname. Notable people with the surname include: 

Jenn Cuneta, Filipino American singer, actress, and model
Pablo Cuneta (1910–2000), Filipino politician 
Sharon Cuneta (born 1966), Filipina actress, singer and television host